Laurent Le Boulc'h (born 4 September 1960) is a French Roman Catholic bishop.

Ordained to the priesthood in 1988, Le Boulc'h was named bishop of the Roman Catholic Diocese of Coutances and Avranches, France in 2013.

See also
 Catholic Church in France
 List of the Roman Catholic dioceses of France

References

1960 births
Living people
Bishops of Coutances
Bishops of Avranches
People from Loudéac
21st-century Roman Catholic bishops in France